Edgar W. Howell House is a historic home located at Buffalo, Erie County, New York. It was built about 1889, and is a -story Late Victorian style frame dwelling with eclectic design elements.  The three bay dwelling has a hipped roof and decorative entrance porch.

It was listed on the National Register of Historic Places in 2007.  It is located in the Elmwood Historic District–East.

References

Houses on the National Register of Historic Places in New York (state)
Houses completed in 1889
Houses in Buffalo, New York
National Register of Historic Places in Buffalo, New York
Historic district contributing properties in Erie County, New York